Joe Scully is a fictional character from the Australian soap opera Neighbours, played by Shane Connor. He made his first on-screen appearance on 20 October 1999, along with his family.

Development
In October 1999, the five-strong Scully family were introduced to Neighbours, replacing the departing Martin family. The Scullys were the first new family to be introduced to the show since Ruth Wilkinson (Ailsa Piper) arrived with her twins in 1996. Actor Shane Connor was cast as Joe Scully, the patriarch of the family in July 1999. He had previously made a guest appearance in the show as Phil Hoffman in 1991. Connor was invited to audition for the role of Joe by the show's producers, and he accepted when he learned that there was a chance to work with Janet Andrewartha, who was cast as Joe's wife Lyn. The character of Joe also offered Connor a chance to play someone other than a bad guy or "a man on the verge." Connor was contracted with Neighbours for three years, with 12-month options. He began filming with his on-screen family in August 1999 and made his first screen appearance as Joe on 20 October. Connor's contract was renewed several times during his stay on the show.

Of Joe, Connor said, "Basically, Joe's the only male there when you want something stirred up. Everyone else is so easy to get along with. He's the only one who isn't so easy to get along with. Well, he is, as long as you don't get on the wrong side of him." Connor explained that Joe was not one for caring what others thought and he thought that someone like Joe, who could not care less, would stir up the street. Connor added, "He doesn't fit into the landscape easily, and neither do I." Joe owns his own building business and "lives on the edge".

In 2003, Connor had his contract terminated by Grundy Television and he was dismissed from the show after he developed an amphetamine problem, which caused him to clash with cast members and disrupt filming. Joe made an off-screen exit in early 2004, leaving Erinsborough to take care of his injured father in Bendigo. Connor later filed an unfair dismissal claim against Grundy and sued them for nine months of lost earnings ($200,000). He admitted that he had suffered from "amphetamine hangovers", but he denied that he had been aggressive. He also claimed that Andrewartha did not like him and was behind most of the complaints to producers. Connor later won his case and Grundy Television were ordered to pay him more than $230,000.

Storylines
Joe married Lyn O'Rourke in 1978 and together they had four children – Jack Scully, Felicity Scully, Michelle Scully and Stephanie Scully.

After moving to Ramsay Street Joe started as an apprentice in the building trade. He eventually worked his way up to forming his own construction company, Ozbuilt.

His wife Lyn decided she wanted another baby, and they went on to have their fifth child Oscar Scully. Soon after the birth of Oscar, Joe's father and brother are hospitalised following a tractor accident. Joe left Ramsay Street to take care of his family and his father's farm. Lyn later joined Joe for a short period. However, she wanted to remain in Ramsay Street, and decided she didn't love him anymore. They divorced with Lyn remaining in Ramsay Street and retaining custody of Oscar.

Lyn left Ramsay Street in 2006 and moved to Shelly Bay. Offscreen, she and Joe shared custody of Oscar. Lyn returned to Ramsay Street in 2009 without Oscar, who remains living with Joe.

Reception
Of Joe, Virgin Media said "Ramsay Street's Joe Scully had his hands full with tearaway teen kids, Steph, Flick, Michelle and Jack. If he was not trying to put an end to Flick's latest romance, he was feuding with his neighbour, Karl Kennedy." Andrew Mercado, author of Super Aussie Soaps, describes Joe as being a "permanently missing-in-action" character following his abrupt departure. The BBC said Joe's most notable moment was "Delivering a baby in a bushfire."

References

External links
 Character profile at the BBC
 Character profile at Neighbours.com

Neighbours characters
Fictional taxi drivers
Fictional construction workers
Television characters introduced in 1999
Male characters in television